Alfred Langston Reavis (May 11, 1893 – August 24, 1950) was an American Negro league pitcher in the 1920s.

A native of Brunswick, Virginia, Reavis attended Virginia Normal & Industrial Institute. He played for the Lincoln Giants in 1920, and for both Lincoln and the Bacharach Giants the following season. Reavis died in New Rochelle, New York in 1950 at age 57.

References

External links
Baseball statistics and player information from Baseball-Reference Black Baseball Stats and Seamheads

1893 births
1950 deaths
Bacharach Giants players
Lincoln Giants players
Baseball pitchers
Baseball players from Virginia
People from Brunswick County, Virginia
20th-century African-American sportspeople